Nakhlestan Rural District may refer to:
 Nakhlestan Rural District (Isfahan Province)
 Nakhlestan Rural District (Kerman Province)
 Nakhlestan Rural District (South Khorasan Province)